The Men's decathlon competition at the 2012 Summer Olympics in London, United Kingdom, was held at the Olympic Stadium on 8–9 August.

From the outset, new world record holder Ashton Eaton dominated the events with teammate Trey Hardee his closest competitor.  Notable for his early exit, 2004 champion and former world record holder Roman Šebrle withdrew after finishing last in the 100 m. Eaton's 10.35 100 metres was the top time of the day, Hardee's 10.42 the next best. His 8.03 long jump was almost half a metre further than any other competitor. Dmitriy Karpov won the shot put, but Eaton's 14.66 was just 12 cm short of his personal record. Leonel Suárez won the high jump, but Eaton tied with several members of the field for second best. And Eaton's 46.90 400 metres was over a full second faster than anybody else in the field. Damian Warner had a 40-point advantage for third position after the first day.

Hardee started day two off with a victory over Eaton in the 110 metres hurdles, but it was only .02, narrowing the gap by 3 points. Rico Freimuth was the top discus thrower, with Hardee 85 cm behind him. Eaton's discus was 5.75 m less, giving Hardee almost an extra 120 point dent into the gap. Eaton more than gained that back with the third best pole vault of the day, while Hardee was 40 cm back. In the javelin throw, Leonel Suárez put more than 10 meters on the rest of the contenders, to solidly place himself in bronze medal position. Hardee was the third best thrower, but his gap was not as large as he needed while Eaton set a new personal best in the event. With Eaton holding a 150+ point lead, Hardee a 70-point lead over Suárez, who held an 80-point lead over a crowd of his nearest challengers, the medals were fairly well set before the gun in the 1500 metres. Hans van Alphen led the way to move into fourth place, but nobody made a serious run at improving their medals, instead choosing to just finish the last event. For Suárez, it was his second Olympic bronze medal in a row.

Competition format
The decathlon consists of ten track and field events, with a points system that awards higher scores for better results in each of the ten components. The athletes all compete in one competition with no elimination rounds.

At the end of competition, if two athletes are tied, the athlete who has received more points in the greater number of events is the winner.

Schedule
All times are British Summer Time (UTC+1)

Records
, the existing World and Olympic records were as follows.

Overall results
Key

References

Decathlon
2012
Men's events at the 2012 Summer Olympics